Huitaca is a genus of harvestmen belonging to the family Ogoveidae.

The species of this genus are found in Southern America.

Species:

Huitaca bitaco 
Huitaca boyacaensis 
Huitaca caldas 
Huitaca depressa 
Huitaca sharkeyi 
Huitaca tama 
Huitaca ventralis

References

Harvestmen